The Tallassee Indians were a Minor League Baseball team that represented Tallassee, Alabama in the Georgia–Alabama League from 1939–1949.

External links
Baseball Reference

Baseball teams established in 1939
Baseball teams disestablished in 1949
Professional baseball teams in Alabama
Defunct Georgia-Alabama League teams
Defunct Alabama State League teams
Defunct Alabama-Florida League teams
St. Louis Cardinals minor league affiliates
Pittsburgh Pirates minor league affiliates
Detroit Tigers minor league affiliates
1939 establishments in Alabama
1949 disestablishments in Alabama
Elmore County, Alabama
Tallapoosa County, Alabama
Defunct baseball teams in Alabama
Alabama State League teams